Local elections were held in the United Kingdom in 1988. The Conservative government held its ground and remained ahead in the projected popular vote.

The election resulted in the Conservative Party winning 39% of the popular vote, the Labour Party winning 38% and the Social and Liberal Democrats (SLD) 18%. The Conservatives gained 9 seats, Labour gained 76 seats and the SLD lost 122 seats.

These were the first national elections contested by the SLD, which had just been formed as a merger of the SDP and Liberals after several years of an alliance existing between the two parties.

Summary of results

England

Metropolitan boroughs
All 36 metropolitan borough councils had one third of their seats up for election.

District councils
In 117 districts one third of the council was up for election.

Scotland

District councils

References

Local elections 2006. House of Commons Library Research Paper 06/26.
Vote 1999 BBC News
Vote 2000 BBC News

 
May 1988 events in the United Kingdom